Cadinol is any of several organic compounds with formula , especially:

 α-Cadinol, or 10α-hydroxy-4-cadinene
 δ-Cadinol, also known as torreyol, sesquigoyol, pilgerol, albicaulol
 τ-Cadinol, or cédrélanol